Elvis Presley Lake is a lake in Lee County, Mississippi, United States.

The lake is named for musician Elvis Presley, who was born in nearby Tupelo.

Features
A campground is located on the east shore of the lake.  Private cottages are also located on the lake.

Pleasure boating is permitted on Elvis Presley Lake, and a boatramp is located at the campground.  Other recreational activities include swimming and fishing, and hiking trails are located nearby.

Blue catfish are abundant in the lake.

A tornado in 2014 destroyed a fishing pier and 95 percent of the trees at the campground.

References

Elvis Presley
Lakes of Mississippi
Lee County, Mississippi